Claire O'Connor is a camogie player, winner of All-Ireland Senior medals in the All-Ireland Senior Camogie Championships of 2007, 2010,and 2011. O'Conner was an All Star award winner in 2010 and 2011 as well as a member of the 2011 Team of the Championship.

A gaeilgeoir, she has appeared on the analysis panels of Seó Spóirt, TG4 and reports for Radio na Gaelachta on sporting occasions.

Other awards and club memberships
 National Camogie League medals in 2009, 2010 and 2011. 
 Leinster Championship 2009, 2010, 2011. 
 All-Ireland Under-16 1995
 Winner of All-Ireland Senior club medal in 1995
 Three Leinster Senior Club 1995, 1996, 2000
 Club Senior 1995, 1996, 1999, 2000 (captain), 2008
 Three Senior 'B' Club 2002, 2005 (captain), 2006; 
 Leinster Under-14 1993, 1994
 Leinster Under-16 1995, 1996
 Leinster Under-18 1997, 1998
 Leinster Senior 1999, 2000, 2003, 2007
 Junior Gael Linn Cup with Leinster 1999
 Leinster Senior Colleges with Coláiste Bríde 1996, 1998, 1999 (captain)
 Purple and Gold Star 2008.

Personal life

O'Connor is the daughter of Teddy O'Connor, All-Ireland senior medal winner with Wexford in 1968. Her sister, Aoife, was the senior team captain in 2010 and is married to Declan Ruth. Three other sisters Niamh, Ciara and Eimear - all won National League Division two medals.

References

External links
 Camogie.ie - Official Camogie Association Website
 Wexford Wexford camogie site
 Profile in Irish Times 12 Aug 2011
 Profile in Irish Independent 12 Aug 2011

1980 births
Living people
Wexford camogie players